This is a list of islands of Russia.

 Aleksandry, Franz Josef Land
 Atlasov Island, Kuril Islands
 Ayon
 Belkovsky, New Siberian Islands
 Bely Island, in the Kara Sea
 Bennett Island, De Long Islands 
 Big Diomede (Ratmanov Island)
 Bolotny Ostrov, Moskva River, Moscow city
 Bolshevik Island, Severnaya Zemlya
 Bolshoy Lyakhovsky
 Bolshoy Shantar Island, Shantar Islands
 De Long, New Siberian Islands
 Dikson Island, in the Kara Sea
 Georga, Franz Josef Land
 Graham Bell Island, Franz Josef Land
 Henrietta Island, De Long Islands 
 Herald Island
 Iony Island, Sea of Okhotsk
 Iturup (Etorofu), Kuril Islands, claimed by Japan
 Jeannette Island, De Long Islands 
 Kolguyev
 Komsomolets, Severnaya Zemlya
 Kotelny Island, New Siberian Islands
 Kunashir, Kuril Islands
 Lisy Island, Nakhodka Bay
 Maly Taymyr Island
 Mezhdusharskiy Island, Novaya Zemlya
 Novaya Sibir, New Siberian Islands
 Novaya Zemlya
 Oktyabrskoy Revolyutsii, Severnaya Zemlya
 Olkhon, lake Baikal
 Onekotan, Kuril Islands
 Rudolfa, Franz Josef Land
 Paramushir, Kuril Islands
 Pioneer, Severnaya Zemlya
 Popov Island, Eugénie Archipelago
 Putyatin Island
 Reyneke Island, Eugénie Archipelago
 Russky Island, Eugénie Archipelago
 Russky Island, Nordenskiöld Archipelago
 Sakhalin
 Salm Island, Franz Josef Land
 Schmidt Island, Severnaya Zemlya
 Severny Island, Novaya Zemlya
 Shiashkotan, Kuril Islands
 Shumshu, Kuril Islands
 Simushir, Kuril Islands
 Solovetskiye
 Taymyr Island
 Uyedineniya Island, northern fringe of the Kara Sea
 Urup, Kuril Islands
 Ushakov Island, northern fringe of the Kara Sea
 Ushkan Islands, lake Baikal
 Vasilyevsky Island, St. Peterburg
 Vaygach
 Vilcheka, Franz Josef Land
 Vize Island, northern fringe of the Kara Sea
 Wrangel Island (Vrangelya)
 Yaya Island
 Yunosti Island, Angara River in the city of Irkutsk
 Yuzhny, Novaya Zemlya
 Zhokhov Island, De Long Islands

External links

Russia, List of islands of

Islands